Ḍaḍwāl is a village and the center of Ismailkhel and Mandozai District in Khost Province, Afghanistan. The villagers are mostly educated and trained in different jobs. There is girls high school.

See also
 Khost Province

References

External links

Populated places in Khost Province